Cinnabon is an American chain of baked goods stores and kiosks, normally found in areas with high pedestrian traffic such as malls, airports and rest stops. The company's signature item is the cinnamon roll. As of December 2017, there are more than 1,200 Cinnabon bakeries operating in 48 countries. Its headquarters are in Sandy Springs, Georgia, United States.

The company is co-owned — with Schlotzsky's, Carvel, Moe's Southwest Grill, McAlister's Deli, Jamba, and Auntie Anne's brands — by Focus Brands, an affiliate of private equity firm Roark Capital Group, based in Sandy Springs, Georgia, operating over 5,000 stores.

History

The first Cinnabon opened on December 4, 1985, Federal Way, Washington at SeaTac Mall, now called The Commons at Federal Way. Cinnabon was an offshoot of the Seattle Based Restaurants Unlimited restaurant chain majority owned by Rich Komen with minority partner and CEO Ray Lindstrom at the helm. Komen and Lindstrom wanted to create the perfect cinnamon roll, eventually hiring Jerilyn Brusseau to finalize the recipe since Brusseau was famous for her baking in the Seattle area. The first bakery began by serving only its cinnamon rolls with a sign touting "World Famous Cinnamon Rolls". Cinnabon's first franchise-operated store opened in August 1986 just outside of Philadelphia at the King of Prussia Mall. Cinnabon stores today can also be found in gas stations, universities, rapid transit stations, casinos, and amusement parks.

Cinnabon was bought by AFC Enterprises, Inc. in 1998 for $65 million. In 2004, AFC Enterprises, Inc., sold Cinnabon for $30.3 million to FOCUS Brands, Inc., which is owned by the Atlanta-based private equity firm Roark Capital Group. The headquarters moved to Greater Atlanta in 1999. In 2020, British retail group EG Group announced a partnership with Cinnabon to open 150 branded stores in the UK over 5 years.

On October 8, 2018, Cinnabon partnered with Pizza Hut to release mini Cinnabon cinnamon rolls, (also known as MiniBons outside of Pizza Hut) labeled "Cinnabon Mini Rolls" in Pizza Hut. These cinnamon rolls have been in Pizza Hut ever since.

In 2020, Pizza Hut brought back the Triple Treat Box, containing 2 medium one-topping pizzas, five breadsticks, and ten Cinnabon Mini Rolls.

International locations

Current locations
Cinnabon has franchise operations in 48 countries and places which include:

 Armenia
 Australia
 Azerbaijan
 Bahrain
 Belarus
 Bolivia
 Brunei
 Canada 
 Chile 
 Colombia
 Costa Rica
 Cyprus
 Czech Republic 
 Dominican Republic
 Ecuador
 Egypt
 El Salvador
 Greece
 Guatemala 
 Honduras
 Hong Kong 
 India
 Indonesia
 Jamaica
 Japan
 Jordan
 Kuwait
 Libya (Cinnabon is noted for being the first U.S franchise to open in Libya after the ouster of Muammar Gaddafi in 2011.)
 Malta
 Malaysia
 Mexico
 Morocco
 Netherlands
 Oman
 Pakistan
 Panama
 Paraguay
 Peru
 Philippines
 Puerto Rico
 Qatar  
 Russia
 Saudi Arabia
 Singapore
 South Africa
 South Korea
 Spain
 Thailand
 Trinidad and Tobago
 Turkey
 Ukraine
 United Arab Emirates
 United Kingdom (Partnership with EG Group)
 United States
 Venezuela

Former locations
 Austria
 Finland (One outlet opened in March 2015, but it was closed in March 2016)
 Israel (Closed in August 2016)
 Lebanon (Closed in 2020)
 Poland (Closed in March 2021)
 Romania (Closed in 2018)
 Sweden (Closed in November 2020)
 Syria

In popular culture
In the AMC television series Better Call Saul, the main character, Saul Goodman, is shown working at a Cinnabon store in Nebraska as he is a fugitive from justice and living under the assumed name "Gene Takavic".

Several comedians, including Louis C.K. and Jim Gaffigan, have admitted to consuming Cinnabons in a self-deprecating way.

In the Starkid musical Black Friday, the audience overhears Linda Monroe remind her husband that is not allowed "within a thousand feet of a Cinnabon". The reason why is never explicitly mentioned, although Linda says she doesn't believe he just wants to smell them.

In the 2007 animated comedy film Bee Movie, protagonist Barry B. Benson describes a Cinnabon to his friend Adam Flayman that it's "bread and cinnamon and frosting, and they heat it up, really hot!" Later in the film, after Barry says that "Adam here has been a huge help," Adam is shown sleeping in a Cinnabon box.

Toward the end of the 2013 film The Secret Life of Walter Mitty, protagonist Walter Mitty meets with his eHarmony customer service representative, Todd Maher, at a Cinnabon.

In the 2017 comedy-drama film Please Stand By, protagonist Wendy Welcott works at a Cinnabon chain in a mall in San Francisco, California.

In the sitcom Brooklyn 99, Captain Raymond Holt played by Andre Braugher pronounces the chain as seen-a-bawn.

See also
 List of bakery cafés

References

External links

 Official website
 Scents from a Mall: The Sticky, Untold Story of Cinnabon from Seattle Met

Restaurants established in 1985
American companies established in 1985
1985 establishments in Washington (state)
Bakery cafés
Fast-food chains of the United States
Bakeries of the United States
Companies based in Sandy Springs, Georgia
Restaurant chains in the United States
Private equity portfolio companies
1998 mergers and acquisitions
2004 mergers and acquisitions